Chad Haga (born August 26, 1988) is an American professional road racing cyclist, who currently rides for UCI ProTeam .

Career
He was born in McKinney, Texas and attended Texas A&M University where he earned his Bachelor of Science in Mechanical Engineering in 2010. While there he raced collegiately with the Texas A&M Cycling Team and as an amateur with Team Brain and Spine Cycling and Super Squadra. After Graduation he joined the Rio Grande Cycling squad. He began racing professionally in 2011 after joining , before joining  in 2014.

On January 23, 2016, he was one of the six members of the  who were hit by a car which drove into on-coming traffic while they were training in Calpe, Spain. All riders were in stable condition.

Haga started the 2018 season by racing the Tour Down Under. In July 2018, he was named in the start list for the Tour de France. He won the final individual time trial stage of the 2019 Giro d'Italia, his first victory in a Grand Tour.

Major results

2011
 1st Prologue Mount Hood Classic
 3rd Overall Tour of Elk Grove
2012
 1st Prologue Cascade Cycling Classic
 4th Copperas Cove Classic
2013
 1st  Overall Joe Martin Stage Race
 1st Prologue Tour of Elk Grove
 2nd Overall Volta ao Alentejo
 2nd Overall Redlands Bicycle Classic
1st Stage 1
 3rd USA Cycling National Racing Calendar
 3rd Overall McLane Pacific Classic
 3rd Overall Cascade Cycling Classic
 5th Time trial, National Road Championships
 10th Overall Tour of California
2017
 1st Mount Evans Hill Climb
2018
 2nd  Team time trial, UCI Road World Championships
 2nd Time trial, National Road Championships
2019
 1st Stage 21 (ITT) Giro d'Italia
2020
 5th Overall Czech Cycling Tour
 6th Overall Okolo Slovenska
2021
 2nd Time trial, National Road Championships

Grand Tour general classification results timeline

References

External links

USA Cycling rider results

1988 births
Living people
American male cyclists
American Giro d'Italia stage winners
People from McKinney, Texas
Cyclists from Texas